Fernando Patricio Cordero Fonseca (born 26 August 1987) is a Chilean footballer as a left back who currently plays for Unión La Calera.

Honours

Club
Universidad Católica
 Primera División de Chile (3): 2016–C, 2016–A, 2018
 Supercopa de Chile: 2016

External links
Fernando Cordero at Football-Lineups

1987 births
Living people
Footballers from Santiago
Chilean footballers
Chilean expatriate footballers
Chile international footballers
Association football forwards
Unión Española footballers
Curicó Unido footballers
Club Deportivo Universidad Católica footballers
San Martín de Tucumán footballers
Universidad de Concepción footballers
Unión La Calera footballers
Ñublense footballers
Chilean Primera División players
Primera B de Chile players
Argentine Primera División players
Chilean expatriate sportspeople in Argentina
Expatriate footballers in Argentina